Alberta Provincial Highway No. 575, commonly referred to as Highway 575, is the designation of an east-west highway in central Alberta, Canada.  It runs from the Highway 791, through Acme and Carbon, to Highway 9 and Highway 56 in Drumheller.  The section between Highway 837 and Drumheller is part of the Dinosaur Trail.

History 
The section of Highway 575 between Acme and Carbon has had a variety of designations in its history.  The  section between Carbon and Highway 21, along with a portion of present-day Highway 836, was originally designated as part of Highway 26;  while the  section between Highway 21 and Acme, along with present-day Highway 806, was the original alignment of Highway 21.  In 1958, the southern portion of Highway 21 was realigned to Highway 1 (Trans-Canada Highway) east of Strathmore, and the former section was renumbered as Highway 21A; however, in 1962, the route was again renumbered to Highway 26.  Highway 26 was decommissioned in 1970 and in 1972, it was renumbered to its current designation.

Major intersections 
From south to north:

References 

575
Drumheller